Aitor Blanco Aldeano (born 21 February 1977) is a Spanish former footballer who played as a central defender.

He played 439 matches in Segunda División B, representing a host of clubs in the competition. His professional input consisted of 22 appearances for Mirandés.

Club career
Born in Vitoria-Gasteiz, Álava, Blanco only started playing organised football at the age of 21, with CD Aurrerá de Vitoria in Segunda División B. He spent the better part of his career at that level, also representing UD Lanzarote, CD Recreación de La Rioja, CF Palencia and CD Mirandés.

Blanco appeared in 27 games (all starts) in his first season with the latter club, helping it promote to Segunda División for the first time ever. He added six matches and two goals in the side's semi-final run in the Copa del Rey.

On 17 August 2012, at the age of 35 years and five months, Blanco played his first match as a professional, in a 0–1 home loss against SD Huesca. He scored his first goal in division two on 1 September, contributing to a 4–0 away win over Xerez CD.

Blanco left the club in June 2013, and joined third-tier team SD Amorebieta shortly after. He retired aged 39, following 89 competitive appearances.

References

External links

1977 births
Living people
Footballers from Vitoria-Gasteiz
Spanish footballers
Association football defenders
Segunda División players
Segunda División B players
Logroñés CF footballers
CF Palencia footballers
CD Mirandés footballers
SD Amorebieta footballers
CD Aurrerá de Vitoria footballers
UD Lanzarote players